Hano or HANO may refer to:

 Hano, Arizona
Hanö, an island off Listerlandet peninsula, western Blekinge, Sweden
Arizona Tewa, a Tewa Pueblo group
"Hano" (song), a song in the 2001 Eurovision Song Contest by Nino Pršeš
Housing Authority of New Orleans
Raga language, spoken in Vanuatu

People 
 Horst Hano (born 1937), German journalist
 Johannes Hano (born 1963), German journalist

See also
 Hanno (disambiguation)